Peter Jon LoPresti (born May 23, 1954) is an American former ice hockey goaltender. He is the son of former National Hockey League (NHL) goaltender Sam LoPresti.

LoPresti started his NHL career with the Minnesota North Stars in 1974 after playing college hockey for the University of Denver, and became the NHL's youngest regular goalie that season. He was also a member of Team USA in the 1976 Canada Cup as well as the 1976 and 1978 Ice Hockey World Championship tournaments.

LoPresti lost his job as the North Stars starting goaltender in 1978–79 to Gilles Meloche and retired for the first time after failing to make the Edmonton Oilers roster the following season. He would later briefly return to the Oilers for the 1981 season before retiring for good.

External links

Pete LoPresti at Hockeydraftcentral.com

1954 births
Living people
American men's ice hockey goaltenders
American people of Italian descent
Denver Pioneers men's ice hockey players
Edmonton Oilers players
Houston Aeros draft picks
Ice hockey players from Minnesota
Sportspeople from Eveleth, Minnesota
Minnesota North Stars draft picks
Minnesota North Stars players
New Haven Nighthawks players
Oklahoma City Stars players
Wichita Wind players